The Romanian barbel (Barbus petenyi) is a species of ray-finned fish in the genus Barbus. It occurs in the lower Danube basin of Bulgaria and Romania, as well as in several rivers of Bulgaria flowing into the Black Sea, such as Kamchiya. The species is named after János_Salamon_Petényi.

Males can reach 25 cm in length.

References

Footnotes 
 

Barbus
Freshwater fish of Europe
Taxa named by Johann Jakob Heckel
Fish described in 1852